Maritino Nemani (born ) is a Fijian rugby union footballer. His regular playing position is as a winger. He plays for the Chiefs in Super Rugby and Bay of Plenty in the ITM Cup.

Early years
Nemani is from Nadivakarua, Kubu-lau, Bua. He attended Sacred Heart College in Auckland, and represented New Zealand Secondary Schools. He represented Fiji under 20 in the 2010 IRB Junior World Championship. He joined French side FC Grenoble in 2015.

Relatives
Nemani 'Junior' is the son of former Fiji and Suva soccer skipper Maritino Nemani.

References

External links 
Chiefs profile
Yahoo NZ profile
It's Rugby profile

1991 births
Fijian rugby union players
Chiefs (rugby union) players
Highlanders (rugby union) players
Hawke's Bay rugby union players
Bay of Plenty rugby union players
Rugby union wings
Fijian emigrants to New Zealand
Living people
People from Bua Province
I-Taukei Fijian people
New Zealand people of I-Taukei Fijian descent
People educated at Sacred Heart College, Auckland
FC Grenoble players
Green Rockets Tokatsu players